Alyse Surratt Galvin (born July 18, 1965) is an American businesswoman, education advocate, and politician from the state of Alaska. Galvin was an independent candidate for the U.S. House of Representatives in Alaska's at-large congressional district in 2018 and 2020, running with the endorsement of the Alaska Democratic Party. She lost both times to incumbent Republican Don Young. She represents the 14th district in the Alaska House of Representatives.

Early life and education 
Galvin was born in Riverside, California and raised in Alaska.

Galvin graduated from The Bishop's School in La Jolla, California, and earned a Bachelor of Arts in political science from the University of California, San Diego.

Career 
Galvin worked as a manager at the Anchorage Sheraton. She is an education advocate, and was a part of Bill Walker's transition team in 2014 after his election as governor of Alaska. She co-founded Great Alaska Schools which is an advocacy group for education funding.

Congressional elections 
On January 11, 2018, Galvin announced her candidacy for Alaska's at-large congressional district in the 2018 United States House of Representatives election in Alaska as an independent. Alaska held their primaries on August 27, 2018. Galvin opted to run in the Democratic primary, receiving 54.1% of the vote, beating out three other contenders. The 2018 general election was held on November 6, 2018. Galvin faced incumbent Republican Don Young. On election day Galvin won 46.7% of the vote, losing to Young.

Galvin announced that she would run again in the 2020 United States House of Representatives election in Alaska. She calls Alaska "ground zero for the climate crisis" and supports investment in renewable energy and energy efficiency; she opposes the Pebble Mine. However, she agreed with her opponent Don Young on other resource issues, including Arctic oil drilling.

Alaska House of Representatives 
Galvin announced in late 2021 that she would run for the Alaska Legislature, although she did not initially announce whether she would run for a seat in the Alaska House of Representatives or the Alaska Senate, due to complications with redistricting. She chose to run for Alaska's 14th House of Representatives district against Republican candidate Nicholas Danger.

Personal life 
Galvin is married to Pat, an oil executive who served as the revenue commissioner for Governor Sarah Palin. They have three sons and a daughter.

Electoral history

References

External links 

 

Living people
Alaska Independents
Politicians from Anchorage, Alaska
Women in Alaska politics
Women political candidates
1965 births